Matheus Barcelos da Silva (born 18 March 1997), known as Matheus Babi,  is a Brazilian professional footballer who plays as a forward for Portuguese club Santa Clara, on loan from Athletico Paranaense.

Club career
Born in Macaé, Rio de Janeiro, Babi represented Macaé Esporte as a youth. He made his first team debut on 29 February 2016, coming on as a second-half substitute for Yuri in a 3–1 Campeonato Carioca away loss against Volta Redonda.

On 31 May 2016, Babi signed his first professional contract, agreeing to a deal until May 2018. Thirteen days later, he agreed to a loan deal with Grêmio until December 2017, and was assigned back to the under-20 squad.

Back to Macaé for the 2018 campaign, Babi scored his first senior goal on 10 January of that year, netting the opener in a 3–3 home draw against America-RJ. He also featured regularly in the 2018 Série D and in the 2019 Campeonato Carioca before joining America on loan on 19 March 2019.

Babi scored 12 goals in only 27 appearances for America, helping in their promotion as runners-up. He returned to Macaé in November 2019, for the ensuing Cariocão, and scored five goals during the competition.

On 15 February 2020, Babi signed a three-year contract with Serra Macaense, but was loaned to Série A club Botafogo on 3 July. He made his debut in the top tier on 13 August, starting and scoring the equalizer in a 1–1 away draw against Red Bull Bragantino.

Career statistics

Honours

Club
 Athletico Paranaense
 Copa Sudamericana: 2021

References

External links
 Botafogo profile 

1997 births
People from Macaé
Sportspeople from Rio de Janeiro (state)
Living people
Brazilian footballers
Association football forwards
Macaé Esporte Futebol Clube players
America Football Club (RJ) players
Botafogo de Futebol e Regatas players
Club Athletico Paranaense players
C.D. Santa Clara players
Campeonato Brasileiro Série A players
Campeonato Brasileiro Série D players
Primeira Liga players
Brazilian expatriate footballers
Expatriate footballers in Portugal
Brazilian expatriate sportspeople in Portugal